Frithjof Fearnley (December 16, 1896 – April 18, 1971) was a Norwegian actor.

Fearnley was born in Kristiania (now Oslo). He debuted in 1920 in a traveling theater with Hauk Aabel and Harald Stormoen, and he later worked at Chat Noir, the Mayol Theater, the Casino Theater, the National Theater in Bergen, the Trøndelag Theater, the Central Theater, and the National Traveling Theater, and in a number of private traveling theaters. He performed extensively in lighter repertoire, but he also played Aegeus in Medea, Mephistopheles in Faust, and Professor Higgins in Pygmalion. He was also popular in comedy roles, such as Preben in På solsiden and the church servant Evensen in Den store barnedåpen. As an actor, he was active until shortly before his death. He was married to the actress Randi Brænne for a time.

Filmography
1925: Fager er lien as Fredrik-August Reventlow, an estate owner
1933: En stille flirt as Mr. Wilder
1946: Om kjærligheten synger de as the judge
1949: Vi flyr på Rio as Helmer's father
1952: Det kunne vært deg as a sailor
1957: På slaget åtte as the judge
1958: Pastor Jarman kommer hjem
1959: 5 loddrett as Pidden
1961: Et øye på hver finger as the man with a beard
1961: Line as Line's father
1961: Bussen as Fjell-Olsen, a clerk
1961: Et øye på hver finger as the man with a beard
1968: Hennes meget kongelige høyhet
1970: Balladen om mestertyven Ole Høiland as the director at the Bank of Norway

References

External links

Frithjof Fearnley at the Swedish Film Database

1896 births
1971 deaths
Norwegian male stage actors
Norwegian male film actors
Norwegian male silent film actors
20th-century Norwegian male actors
Male actors from Oslo